
Gmina Szulborze Wielkie is a rural gmina (administrative district) in Ostrów Mazowiecka County, Masovian Voivodeship, in east-central Poland.

Villages
Gmina Szulborze Wielkie contains the villages and settlements of Brulino-Lipskie, Godlewo-Gudosze, Gostkowo, Grędzice, Helenowo, Janczewo Wielkie, Janczewo-Sukmanki, Leśniewo, Mianówek, Słup-Kolonia, Smolewo-Parcele, Smolewo-Wieś, Świerże-Leśniewek, Szulborze Wielkie, Uścianek-Dębianka and Zakrzewo-Zalesie.

Neighbouring gminas
Gmina Szulborze Wielkie is bordered by the gminas of Andrzejewo, Czyżew-Osada, Nur and Zaręby Kościelne.

References

Polish official population figures 2006

Szulborze Wielkie
Ostrów Mazowiecka County